Sidney Wileman (26 April 1910 – 26 June 1985) was an English footballer who played for Gresley Rovers, Derby County, Port Vale, and Hinckley United.

Career
Wileman played for Hugglescote Wesleyans, Gresley Rovers, Nottingham Forest (on trial) and Derby County, before joining Port Vale for a "substantial fee" in June 1938. He made his debut at The Old Recreation Ground in a 3–1 defeat by Aldershot on 27 August and started the next two Third Division South games. However he was only selected once more in the league that season, before being transferred to Hinckley United in August 1939.

Career statistics
Source:

References

1910 births
1985 deaths
People from Coalville
Footballers from Leicestershire
English footballers
Association football midfielders
Gresley F.C. players
Nottingham Forest F.C. players
Derby County F.C. players
Port Vale F.C. players
Hinckley United F.C. players
English Football League players